Anatoly Ivanovich Antonov (born 15 May 1955) is a Russian military officer and diplomat who is currently the Ambassador of Russia to the United States, formally replacing  Sergey Kislyak  on 21 August 2017 by presidential decree. With a reputation as a hardliner and tough negotiator, Antonov took up his post in Washington, D.C. on 1 September 2017. He was formerly Deputy Minister of Defence and Deputy Minister of Foreign Affairs. Since 2015, he has been under sanctions of the European Union and Canada, in response to Russia's military intervention in Ukraine.

Early life and education
Antonov was born on 15 May 1955 in Omsk, USSR. In 1978, Antonov graduated from the Moscow State Institute of International Relations (MGIMO), and in 1983 received a master's degree.

In 2012, he earned his doctorate of political science from the Institute of World Economy and International Relations in Moscow. His doctoral dissertation was entitled Controlling nuclear weapons as a factor in ensuring national and international security. He is fluent in English and Burmese.

Career

Antonov began his diplomatic career after earning his undergraduate degree in 1978. He spent the next 30 years at the Soviet Ministry of Foreign Affairs and its successor, the Russian Ministry of Foreign Affairs, where his area of speciality was control of nuclear, chemical and biological weapons.  In 2004, he was appointed Director of the Department for Security and Disarmament.

On 2 February 2011, he was promoted by a Presidential Decree to become Deputy Minister of Defence of the Russian Federation.

As Deputy Minister of Defense, he was personally  sanctioned by the European Union following Russia's military intervention in Ukraine. He had accused NATO in December 2014 of turning Ukraine into a "frontline of confrontation" with Russia.

On 28 December 2016, he was appointed Deputy Minister of Foreign Affairs.

In March 2017, he was named as one of the candidates for the post of Permanent Representative of Russia to the United Nations, after the death of Vitaly Churkin. However, in the end, it was decided to appoint Vasily Nebenzya to this post.

Ambassador to the United States

Nomination and confirmation

Antonov is considered a hardliner against the West, earning him a reputation as a "bull terrier." In early autumn 2016, he was considered to be the next Russian Ambassador to the United States as the Kremlin assumed that Hillary Clinton  would win the presidential election and, therefore, bilateral relations would remain strained. However, despite the fact that  Donald Trump won the election, Antonov was still chosen to take over the post from Sergey Kislyak, who had been the ambassador since 2008. In February 2017, Antonov was named the main candidate for this post. On 11 May 2017, the Russian Foreign Ministry formally submitted Antonov to the Federal Assembly, which voted to endorse him as ambassador on 18 May following a closed session of the State Duma's foreign policy committee.

On 21 August 2017, Vladimir Putin formally appointed Antonov as the Ambassador of Russia to the United States by presidential decree.

Term
Antonov was recalled to Moscow on 17 March 2021 after US President Joe Biden called Putin a "killer." The decision to return Antonov to Washington, D.C. was made following the results of the 2021 Russia–United States summit.

On 20 February 2022, Antonov denied that Russia was planning an invasion of Ukraine.

Awards
Order "For Merit to the Fatherland" IV class
Order of Alexander Nevsky
Order of Military Merit
Order of Honour (twice)
Order of Friendship
Medal "For the Return of Crimea"
Jubilee Medal "70 Years of the Armed Forces of the USSR"
Medal "For strengthening combat Commonwealth"
Medal "For distinction in military service" I class
Medal "For distinction in military service" II class
Medal "For distinction in military service" III class

References

External links

Anatoly Antonov Profile at Russia Ministry of Foreign Affairs

1955 births
Living people
1st class Active State Councillors of the Russian Federation
Ambassador Extraordinary and Plenipotentiary (Russian Federation)
Ambassadors of Russia to the United States
Politicians from Omsk
Recipients of the Order of Honour (Russia)
Recipients of the Order of Military Merit (Russia)
Moscow State Institute of International Relations alumni
United Russia politicians
Recipients of the Order "For Merit to the Fatherland", 4th class
Russian individuals subject to European Union sanctions
Military personnel from Omsk
Deputy Defence Ministers of Russia